Ali Mohammed Mujawar (Arabic: علي محمد مجور; born 26 April 1953) served as Prime Minister of Yemen between 7 April 2007 and 10 December 2011, and prior as electricity minister.

Following the anti-government uprising in Yemen, President Ali Abdullah Saleh fired Mujawar and the other members of the Cabinet of Yemen on 20 March 2011, but asked them to remain until a new government was formed. During the uprising, on 3 June 2011, Mujawar was seriously injured in the same attack which critically wounded President Saleh. He underwent treatment in Riyadh, Saudi Arabia.

On 29 August 2012 Yemeni former President Abdrabbuh Mansour Hadi appointed Ali Mujawar as Yemen's Permanent Representative to the United Nations in Geneva.

See also
Cabinet of Yemen

References

External links
Parliament of Yemen Official Website

1953 births
Living people
People of the Yemeni Revolution
Prime Ministers of Yemen
General People's Congress (Yemen) politicians
People from Shabwah Governorate
21st-century Yemeni politicians
21st-century prime ministers of Yemen
Electricity ministers of Yemen